Iarfhlaith Davoren (born 12 May 1986) is an Irish former professional football player. He played as a left back or left winger. Davoren is a native of Tullamore, County Offaly.

Youth
Davoren began his playing career with Tullamore Town before attracting attention from Belvedere in the Dublin District Schoolboys League (DDSL). Travelling to Dublin and school became problematic so Davoren moved to Willow Park Boys F.C. in the Athlone and District School boys league. The schoolboy club is noted for producing players for Athlone Town and Davoren became another name on the list when he signed at St. Mel's Park, making his first team debut against Dundalk in July 2004, at the age of 17.

He studied at NUI Galway.

Career

Athlone Town
Davoren started his career with Athlone Town in the League of Ireland First Division in 2004.

Galway United
Iarfhlaith signed for Galway United in 2006. He made his debut in a 3–0 win against Finn Harps. In his fourth match for Galway United he scored his first goal for the club against Cobh Ramblers but made just three league appearances over the next eighteen months. He was sent on loan to Institute.

Longford Town
Davoren signed for Longford Town in 2008. His stay at Flancare was short and in July 2008 he returned to Galway United.

Galway United return
Davoren re-signed for Galway in 2008 and he played 11 games for Galway United over the rest of the 2008 season. Davoren played 16 league games during the 2009 season before he left the club for Sligo Rovers.

Sligo Rovers
Davoren and joined Sligo Rovers at the start of the 2010 season on a free transfer. After struggling with injuries early in his time at the Showgrounds Davoren settled quickly and firmly established himself as left back in the Rovers side and started the last 30 games of the season consecutively. This included playing in the victorious EA Sports Cup and FAI Cup finals giving a fantastic energetic display in the latter. He continued well into the 2011 season playing the first 23 games until sustaining an injury against Bohemians that broke his run of 53 consecutive starts. Davoren scored the equalizing goal in the 2011 FAI Cup Final forcing the game to extratime and penalties.

Hibernian trial
Davoren went on trial with Scottish Premier League club Hibernian in December 2011.

Cork City
Davoren signed for Cork City in April 2014. Davoren made his debut for Cork City in a league game against his former club, Sligo Rovers on 11 April 2014. Davoren left Cork City on 30 July 2014. He rejoined his former club Sligo Rovers the following day.

Return to Galway United
In January 2019, Davoren linked up with former team-mate Alan Murphy by signing for Galway United in the League of Ireland First Division as a player-coach. He was returning to the club despite a decade having passed from his last appearance for the club.

International
Davoren has also represented Ireland at university level whilst studying at NUI Galway.

Honours
Sligo Rovers
League of Ireland (1): 2012
FAI Cup (3): 2010, 2011, 2013
League of Ireland Cup (1): 2010

References

1986 births
Living people
Alumni of the University of Galway
Association football defenders
Association football midfielders
Athlone Town A.F.C. players
Belvedere F.C. players
Cork City F.C. players
Expatriate soccer players in the United States
Galway United F.C. (1937–2011) players
Institute F.C. players
League of Ireland players
Longford Town F.C. players
Republic of Ireland association footballers
Republic of Ireland expatriate association footballers
Sligo Rovers F.C. players
Sportspeople from County Offaly
FC Tulsa players
USL Championship players